Ingrid Alberini (born 11 September 1978), known by her stage name In-Grid, is an Italian dancer and singer-songwriter. Her 2003 club song "Tu es foutu", (English title: "You Promised Me"), charted in several European countries, Australia, Latin America and in the United States, where it reached number six on the Billboard Dance Music/Club Play Singles chart in 2004.

Career 
The name Ingrid was given by her parents as tribute to the actress and movie star Ingrid Bergman, who was her father's favorite. Ingrid's parents ran a movie theatre in a small city near Parma and Reggio Emilia, an area known as the cradle of Italian music. Ingrid grew up watching movies and listening to sound tracks which, as herself declares, fueled her ambition and desire to convey all her strong emotions to as many people as possible. Ingrid's artistic path started with painting and acting but soon singing turned out to be her most powerful form of expression. She began with piano-bar, musicals and local jazz bands, but soon her soft voice brought her to meet the famous dance music producers Larry Pignagnoli and Marco Soncini. They offered Ingrid to write the lyrics and sing their brand new tune, and soon "Tu es foutu" came to life. The track broke all records of airplay on Italian networks and immediately became an international hit.

Ingrid has released three dance albums, two chill-out albums and various singles, as well as a number of joint projects with other artists.

Discography

Albums

Singles

References

External links 

In-Grid on Discogs

English-language singers from Italy
French-language singers of Italy
Italian dance musicians
Italian pop singers
Italian singer-songwriters
Living people
People from Guastalla
1978 births
21st-century Italian singers
21st-century Italian women singers